Bika (also Romanized as Bīkā; also known as Bī Kāh and Bīkāh) is a city in Bikah Rural District, Bikah District, Rudan County, Hormozgan Province, Iran. At the 2006 census, its population was 6,378, in 1,331 families.

References 

Populated places in Rudan County
Cities in Hormozgan Province